Barry Wayne Haase (born 19 November 1945) is a former Australian politician who served as a Liberal member of the Australian House of Representatives from October 1998 to August 2013.  He initially represented the Western Australian Division of Kalgoorlie, the largest parliamentary constituency by area in the world.  In 2010, Kalgoorlie was abolished, and Haase transferred to the newly created Division of Durack, essentially the northern half of his old electorate.

Haase was born in Southern Cross, Western Australia, and was a company director before entering politics.

He announced his retirement on 15 June 2013.

In 2014 he was appointed to be the Administrator of the Australian Indian Ocean Territories for Christmas Island and the Cocos (Keeling) Islands. He served in this capacity from 5 October 2014 to 4 October 2017.

References

1945 births
Living people
Liberal Party of Australia members of the Parliament of Australia
Members of the Australian House of Representatives for Kalgoorlie
Members of the Australian House of Representatives for Durack
Members of the Australian House of Representatives
Christmas Island administrators
People from Southern Cross, Western Australia
21st-century Australian politicians
20th-century Australian politicians